Reform the Resistance is an American Christian metal and Christian rock band, and they primarily play alternative metal, nu metal, post-rock, and rap rock. They come from both Phoenix, Arizona and Nashville, Tennessee. The band started making music, in 2007, with lead vocalist and guitarist, Jason Moncivaiz, bassist and background vocalist, Sambo Moncivaiz, and drummer and background vocalist, Ryan Dugger. Their first full-length studio album, The Truth Is Dangerous, was released in 2011 by WuLi Records.

Background
Reform the Resistance is a Christian metal and Christian rock band from both Phoenix, Arizona and Nashville, Tennessee. The band formed in 2007, with members, lead vocalist and guitarist, Jason Moncivaiz, bassist and background vocalist, Sambo Moncivaiz, and drummer and background vocalist, Ryan Dugger. The two Moncivaiz brothers were in the band, Justifide.

Music history
The band commenced as a musical entity in 2007, with their release, The Truth Is Dangerous, a studio album, that was released by WuLi Records, on April 26, 2011. On July 7, 2015 the band released the album DOS.

Members
Current
 Jason Moncivaiz – lead vocals, guitar
 Sambo Moncivaiz – bass, background vocals
 Ryan Dugger – drums, background vocals

Discography
Studio albums
 And It Begins (2008)
 The Truth Is Dangerous (April 26, 2011, Blood & Ink Records)
 Dos (July 7, 2015)

References

External links
Official website

Musical groups from Nashville, Tennessee
Musical groups from Phoenix, Arizona
2007 establishments in Arizona
2007 establishments in Tennessee
Musical groups established in 2007
Christian rock groups from Arizona
Rap rock groups
Christian rock groups from Tennessee